Dilara Bağcı (born February 2, 1994) is a Turkish female volleyball player. Bağcı was a member of the youth national team and the women's junior national team. She wears number 18.

Clubs
  İller Bankası (2010-2012)
  Eczacıbaşı VitrA (2012-2013)

Awards

Individuals
 2011 CEV Girls Youth Volleyball European Championship - Best Libero
 2011 FIVB Girls Youth World Championship - Best Receiver
 2011 FIVB Girls Youth World Championship - Best Libero
 2012 Women's Junior European Volleyball Championship - Best Libero

National team
 2011 CEV Girls Youth Volleyball European Championship - 
 2011 European Youth Summer Olympic Festival - 
 2011 FIVB Girls Youth World Championship - 
 2012 Women's Junior European Volleyball Championship - 
 2015 FIVB Volleyball Women's U23 World Championship -

See also
 Turkish women in sports

References

1994 births
Living people
Turkish women's volleyball players
Place of birth missing (living people)
İller Bankası volleyballers